Brodie Neill (born September 1979) is a furniture designer.

Early life

Brodie Neill was born in Tasmania, Australia and lives and works in London.

Neill studied at the Hutchins School and the University of Tasmania (2002) in Australia before completing a master's in furniture design from Rhode Island School of Design in the US (2004).

Design background

Following a successful stint working for in New York, Brodie established a studio in London's East End in 2006, applying his aesthetic to a range of objects. Neill's design contributions such as the E-Turn for Italian brand Kundalini and @Chair were included in Taschen's Design Now!, and the @Chair (2008) was selected by Time magazine for "The Design 100" at its global launch at Salone Satellite in Milan in 2008.

Among Neill's designs are the Jet table for Swarovski, the Curve bench for Riva1920 and the limited edition Remix bench. He has collaborated with international brands including Microsoft, Mercedes-Benz and Alexander McQueen, and his limited edition works are included in museums, galleries and private collections around the globe.

Ocean plastic

In 2016, Brodie Neill represented Australia at the inaugural London Design Biennale at Somerset House with a critically acclaimed installation Plastic Effects, which engaged with the issue of ocean plastic waste. Here, he launched his now iconic Gyro table, created from over half a million fragments of ocean plastic. The limited edition design piece is now in the permanent collections of the National Gallery of Victoria and University of Tasmania, as well as in private collections around the world.

A longstanding champion of using ocean plastic waste to create new materials, Neill presented a multimedia and multisensory installation Drop In The Ocean, a commission by the London Design Festival, again engaging with the issue of ocean plastic waste.

In April 2019, Neill will present a new series of design works, which elevates ocean plastic waste to an art form at Museo Nazionale Scienza e Tecnologia Leonardo da Vinci in Milan, Italy.

Propelled beyond the design sphere into the realms of environmental activism through his work using ocean plastic waste – a role he has embraced – Neill has become a spokesperson for design to take a leading role in the quest to address the world's ailing issues by speaking at the United Nations and European Parliament, among other platforms.

Made in Ratio

Brodie Neill founded Made in Ratio in 2013, a self-designed and self-produced furniture brand, born out of a desire to create a new furniture design language by uniting artisanal craft with advanced digital capabilities. The growing collection includes the critically acclaimed Alpha and Cowrie chairs, both included in Taschen's 1000 Chairs and consistently included in similar publications of contemporary masterpieces.

References

External links 
https://howtospendit.ft.com/travel/203756-brodie-neill-s-perfect-weekend-in-tasmania
https://howtospendit.ft.com/house-garden/200089-eco-glam-upcycled-furniture
https://www.1843magazine.com/design/the-daily/designer-debris-from-brodie-neill
https://www.smh.com.au/lifestyle/how-tasmanian-designer-brodie-neill-was-inspired-by-ocean-waste-20170922-gymr3n.html
https://www.smh.com.au/entertainment/art-and-design/ngv-triennial-confronts-the-wasteland-that-is-our-world-20171209-h01ui5.html
https://www.afr.com/lifestyle/home-design/designer-furniture/brodie-neill-rivets-design-world-with-table-inlaid-with-jetsam-20161013-gs1bhq
https://www.nytimes.com/interactive/2016/09/06/t-magazine/london-design-biennale-must-see-preview.html
https://www.abc.net.au/radio/melbourne/programs/theconversationhour/the-conversation-hour/9252120
https://www.dezeen.com/2017/09/16/drop-in-the-ocean-brodie-neill-ocean-plastic-london-design-festival-2017/
https://www.dezeen.com/2016/09/03/gyro-table-brodie-neill-recycled-ocean-plastic-first-london-design-biennale/
https://www.wallpaper.com/lifestyle/sustainable-design-innovation-for-clean-plastic-free-oceans-2018

1979 births
Living people
University of Tasmania alumni
Australian interior designers